Amy Elizabeth Fisher (born August 21, 1974), an American woman, in 1992 became known in the media as "the Long Island Lolita", when, at the age of 17, she shot and severely wounded Mary Jo Buttafuoco, the wife of Joey Buttafuoco, with whom Fisher was in a sexual relationship. Initially charged with first-degree attempted murder, she eventually pleaded guilty to first-degree aggravated assault and served seven years in prison. Fisher was paroled in 1999 and became a writer, a webcam model, and a pornographic actress.

Early life
Fisher was born in Merrick, New York, on Long Island, to Elliot and Roseann Fisher; her father was Jewish while her mother's family, Fisher has said, was "a mixture of a lot of different things, including English". As a 16-year-old student at Kennedy High School in Bellmore, New York, Fisher allegedly met 35-year-old Joey Buttafuoco in 1990, when her father took his car for repairs to Buttafuoco's auto body shop; Fisher later said she had damaged her own car several times as a pretext to see him, and later admitted that they had an affair when she was still underage.

Crime and prison
Fisher became increasingly jealous of Buttafuoco's wife, Mary Jo Buttafuoco. She obtained a .25-caliber handgun with the assistance of Peter Guagenti, a Brooklyn auto supply salesman who acted as her getaway driver. When Mary Jo Buttafuoco answered the door, Fisher told her that Joey Buttafuoco was having an affair with Fisher's (imaginary) younger sister, providing a T-shirt advertising Buttafuoco's auto body shop as "proof". The conversation lasted about 15 minutes, during which Buttafuoco became increasingly angry. She finally told Fisher to leave and then turned her back to return to the house. Fisher took out the gun, struck Buttafuoco twice with it, then shot her in the head; she later said the severely wounded Buttafuoco fell on her. Fisher dropped both the shirt and the gun and ran towards the car, but then returned for them and Guagenti drove off. Neighbors called 911; Buttafuoco was operated on all night, and although they could not remove the bullet, doctors were able to save her life.

When interviewed by police, Joey Buttafuoco told them that Fisher could be the shooter. When Mary Jo Buttafuoco regained consciousness the next day, she recognized Fisher from a photo. Fisher was arrested and charged with attempted murder, and on September 23, 1992, after accepting a plea bargain, she pleaded guilty to first-degree assault.

Paul Makely tape
In September 1992, the tabloid television show Hard Copy broadcast a videotaped conversation between Fisher and Paul Makely, the owner of a gym in Massapequa. In the tape, recorded hours before she agreed to the plea in court, Fisher could be seen talking about her future, saying that she wanted to marry Makely so he could visit her in prison. Fisher explained that her lawyer believed requiring people to be married for such visits was unconstitutional and that she intended to challenge the law on this matter. Fisher could be seen on the tape saying: "That will keep my name in the press. I want my name in the press. Why? Because I can make a lot of money. I figure if I'm going through all this pain and suffering, I'm getting a Ferrari."

Imprisonment
On December 2, 1992, Fisher was sentenced to 5 to 15 years in prison. She served seven years and was granted parole in May 1999 after Nassau County Court Judge Ira Wexner shortened her maximum sentence to 10 years, which made her immediately eligible for parole. Wexner acted after having found that Fisher had not been appropriately represented by her lawyer at the time of her 1992 guilty plea.

Joey Buttafuoco denied having an affair with Fisher. In October 1992, the Nassau County District Attorney stated that Buttafuoco would not be prosecuted. However, in February 1993, the case against him was reopened due to rape charges made by Fisher. She testified against him in court and based on this testimony and hotel receipts (dated before Fisher's 17th birthday) with Buttafuoco's signature on them, Buttafuoco was charged with statutory rape. Buttafuoco pleaded guilty in October 1993. He served four months in prison.

Life after prison
After her release from prison, Fisher became a columnist for the Long Island Press. Her biography, If I Knew Then..., written by Robbie Woliver, was published in 2004 and became a New York Times bestseller. In 2003, Fisher married Louis Bellera. The couple had three children before divorcing in 2015.

Fisher and Buttafuoco revisited
In 2006, Fisher reunited with Mary Jo Buttafuoco in sessions televised for Entertainment Tonight and its spinoff, The Insider. Fisher said she wanted to heal and move on with her life. However, two years later, she said she felt "no sympathy for Mary Jo", without giving an explanation. Fisher and Joey Buttafuoco eventually reunited for the first time at the 2006 Lingerie Bowl for the coin toss.

In May 2007, Fisher and Joey Buttafuoco met for dinner in Port Jefferson, Long Island, in what TV producer David Krieff said was an attempt to develop a reality-television show. In June and July 2011 Fisher appeared as a cast member in the fifth season of the reality-television series Celebrity Rehab with Dr. Drew, which aired on VH1.

Sex tape and adult entertainment career

In October 2007, the New York Post published allegations that Fisher's husband, Lou Bellera, had sold a sex tape of the couple to Red Light District Video of Los Angeles. Red Light District Video published a press release stating that it intended to release a sex video of the couple. On October 31, frames from the video, showing Fisher naked, were posted at websites; on November 1, 2007, a teaser clip was released by Red Light District Video, showing Fisher naked while she showered and sunbathed. Visible were a tattoo around her navel and the results of breast surgery. On November 6, 2007, Fisher sued Red Light District and its owner, David Joseph, claiming copyright infringement and other damages. But by November 8, 2007, amyfisher.com, a website, whose ownership Fisher had previously fought to win, had begun pointing directly to the Red Light District website.

In early January 2008, Fisher announced that she had settled with Red Light and agreed to do a related promotional appearance. The same announcement indicated that she and Bellera had reconciled. The promotional appearance took place at Retox in New York City on January 4, 2008. Clips of the video were played on The Howard Stern Show. On March 6, 2008, Fisher was a guest on the Stern show, and one topic of discussion was meant to be her video. After the first phone call, which was from Mary Jo Buttafuoco's daughter, Jessica, Fisher left the show, six minutes into her interview.

On January 12, 2009, Fisher released a pay-per-view adult film, Amy Fisher: Totally Nude & Exposed. She signed a deal with Lee Entertainment to become a stripper doing club shows at least once a month. Fisher said she planned to strip until her fans told her, "Dear, please put your clothes back on. You're too old." In September 2010, DreamZone Entertainment released the adult film Deep inside Amy Fisher, calling it the first of eight such films Fisher would produce and in which she would star. The company had announced the movie in July 2010 under the working title The Making of Amy Fisher: Porn Star. In June 2011, Fisher said she was no longer making adult films.
, Amy Fisher is still a webcam model.

Books and films
Books by Amy Fisher
 Fisher, Amy & Robbie Woliver (2004). If I Knew Then. iUniverse. .
 Fisher, Amy with Sheila Weller (1994). Amy Fisher: My Story. (Reprint edition.) . (Originally published by Pocket Books in 1993; .)

Books about Amy Fisher
 Dominguez, Pier (2001). Amy Fisher: Anatomy of a Scandal: The Myth, the Media and the Truth Behind the Long Island Lolita Story. Writers Club Press. .
 Eftimiades, Maria (1992). Lethal Lolita: A True Story of Sex, Scandal and Deadly Obsession. St. Martin's Press. .

Movies about Amy Fisher
 Amy Fisher: My Story, 1992 (TV) Noelle Parker starred as Fisher.
 Casualties of Love: The "Long Island Lolita" Story, 1993 (TV) Alyssa Milano starred as Fisher.
 The Amy Fisher Story, 1993 (TV) Drew Barrymore starred as Fisher.
 Amy Fisher: Totally Nude & Exposed.
 Deep Inside Amy Fisher
 The Making of Amy Fisher: Porn Star.
 
According to Alan Ball, Fisher's story was an inspiration to him in writing the script for the 1999 film American Beauty.

References

External links

 
 Morey, Jed. "Changing Amy", Long Island Press, August 19, 2009.
 Fisher, Amy. "Judging Amy", Long Island Press, June 19, 2002.
 

1974 births
20th-century American criminals
20th-century American non-fiction writers
20th-century American women writers
21st-century American actresses
21st-century American non-fiction writers
21st-century American women writers
Actresses from New York (state)
American autobiographers
American columnists
American female criminals
American people convicted of assault
American pornographic film actresses
American prisoners and detainees
American writers of Italian descent
Criminals from New York (state)
Jewish American actresses
Jewish American writers
Jewish American journalists
Jewish non-fiction writers
Jewish women writers
Living people
Long Island Press people
People from Bellmore, New York
People from Wantagh, New York
People from Wellington, Florida
Pornographic film actors from New York (state)
Prisoners and detainees of New York (state)
Women autobiographers
American women columnists
Writers from New York (state)
American women non-fiction writers
John F. Kennedy High School (Bellmore, New York) alumni
21st-century American Jews